Duncan Alexander James Milroy (born February 8, 1983) is a Canadian retired ice hockey right winger who played five games in the National Hockey League for the Montreal Canadiens.

Playing career
Milroy played in the junior hockey in the Western Hockey League for the Swift Current Broncos. He was drafted in the second round, 37th overall, by the Montreal Canadiens in the 2001 NHL Entry Draft. After a few seasons with the Hamilton Bulldogs of the AHL, Milroy was recalled by the Montreal Canadiens in February 2007 and played 5 games with the team gathering 1 point (an assist). He was reassigned to Hamilton on February 25, 2007, where he remained until the end of the 2007–08 season.

Following a single season in the Germany with ERC Ingolstadt, Milroy returned to North America and signed a one-year contract with the Minnesota Wild on July 17, 2009. After playing the duration of the 2009–10 season with the Wild's AHL affiliate, the Houston Aeros, Milroy again ventured to Europe signing a one-year contract with BK Mladá Boleslav of the Czech Extraliga on September 2, 2010.

With only 6 points in 20 games with Boleslav during the 2010–11 season, Milroy left to commence his second spell in the DEL with Krefeld Pinguine. Milroy finished second on Krefeld with 8 postseason points to earn a one-year extension to remain in Krefeld on May 13, 2011.

Career statistics

Regular season and playoffs

International

Awards and honours

References

External links

1983 births
Living people
Canadian ice hockey right wingers
Hamilton Bulldogs (AHL) players
Houston Aeros (1994–2013) players
ERC Ingolstadt players
Ice hockey people from Edmonton
Kootenay Ice players
Krefeld Pinguine players
BK Mladá Boleslav players
Montreal Canadiens draft picks
Montreal Canadiens players
Swift Current Broncos players
Vålerenga Ishockey players
Canadian expatriate ice hockey players in Norway
Canadian expatriate ice hockey players in Germany
Canadian expatriate ice hockey players in the United States
Canadian expatriate ice hockey players in the Czech Republic